A Wagner–Meerwein rearrangement is a class of carbocation 1,2-rearrangement reactions in which a hydrogen, alkyl or aryl group migrates from one carbon to a neighboring carbon.
  They can be described as cationic [1,2]-sigmatropic rearrangements, proceeding suprafacially and with stereochemical retention.  As such, a Wagner–Meerwein shift is a thermally allowed pericyclic process with the Woodward-Hoffmann symbol [ω0s + σ2s].  They are usually facile, and in many cases, they can take place at temperatures as low as –120 °C. The reaction is named after the Russian chemist Yegor Yegorovich Vagner; he had German origin and published in German journals as Georg Wagner; and Hans Meerwein.

Several reviews have been published.

The rearrangement was first discovered in bicyclic terpenes for example the conversion of isoborneol to camphene:

The story of the rearrangement reveals that many scientists were puzzled with this and related reactions and its close relationship to the discovery of carbocations as intermediates.

In a simple demonstration reaction of 1,4-dimethoxybenzene with either 2-methyl-2-butanol or 3-methyl-2-butanol in sulfuric acid and acetic acid yields the same disubstituted product, the latter via a hydride shift of the cationic intermediate:

Currently, there are works relating to the use of skeletal rearrangement in the synthesis of bridged azaheterocycles. These data are summarized in 

Plausible mechanisms of the Wagner–Meerwein rearrangement of diepoxyisoindoles:

The related Nametkin rearrangement, named after Sergey Namyotkin, involves the rearrangement of methyl groups in certain terpenes. In some cases the reaction type is also called a retropinacol rearrangement (see pinacol rearrangement).

See also
 Demjanov rearrangement

References 

Rearrangement reactions
Name reactions